Yoshiyuki Kono may refer to:

 Yoshiyuki Kono (voice actor)
 Yoshiyuki Kōno (victim), falsely accused by the Japanese media as the perpetrator of the Matsumoto sarin attack